Lirae (singular lira) are fine lines or ridges (much finer than ribs) that are a sculptural feature of the outside of the shells of various animals. The term is commonly applied to the shells of molluscs such as gastropods, bivalves and nautiloids. It can also be used to describe similar sculpture on the surface of the shells of brachiopods.

In addition the word is used to describe fine linear elevations of shelly material within the outer lip of the aperture of some gastropod shells.

The adjectival form of the word is "lirate".

References

Mollusc shells